

Gerhard Berthold (12 March 1891 – 14 April 1942) was a German general in the Wehrmacht of Nazi Germany during World War II who commanded several divisions. He was a recipient of the Knight's Cross of the Iron Cross. Berthold was killed on 14 April 1942 in Zaytseva Gora, Russia. He was posthumously promoted to Generalleutnant.

Awards and decorations

 Clasp to the Iron Cross (1939) 2nd Class (15 September 1939) & 1st Class (1 October 1939)
 Knight's Cross of the Iron Cross on 4 December 1941 as Generalmajor and commander of 31. Infanterie-Division

References

Citations

Bibliography

 
 

1891 births
1942 deaths
People from Schneeberg, Saxony
Lieutenant generals of the German Army (Wehrmacht)
German Army personnel of World War I
Recipients of the clasp to the Iron Cross, 1st class
Recipients of the Knight's Cross of the Iron Cross
German Army personnel killed in World War II
People from the Kingdom of Saxony
Military personnel from Saxony
German Army generals of World War II